This is a list of all teams that contested the Champ Car World Series between its founding in 1979 to its demise in 2007.

2007 Teams
This is a list of teams that contested the Champ Car World Series in 2007, the series' final year of operation. All teams utilized Panoz DP01 chassis and Cosworth engines.

List of Champ Car Teams
Key: 

Source:

See also
List of Champ Car circuits
List of Champ Car drivers
List of fatal Champ Car accidents
List of Champ Car pole positions
List of Champ Car winners
List of Champ Car drivers who never qualified for a race

List of IndyCar Series teams